TrickStyle is a sports video game developed by Criterion Games and published by Acclaim Entertainment for the Dreamcast and Microsoft Windows. Set in the future, the player takes part in stunt-filled hoverboard races through London, Tokyo, and Manhattan, or inside a massive arena called the Velodrome. AirBlade by Criterion and Namco is a spiritual successor. The game received mixed reviews from critics, who praised its graphics and physics, but criticized its gameplay, animations and sound.

Gameplay 
The game initially allows the player to choose a racer and places them in the Velodrome. From there, they can enter different rooms to decide their next challenge. The player can either challenge the Velodrome trainer to unlock new tricks, or race to unlock new areas and hoverboards. For the challenges, the player must pass through a series of gates before time expires. For racing, the player progresses through tracks on 3 different continents, the US, UK, and Japan. Once all five races on each continent are complete, the player unlocks a "boss race" which unlocks a new hoverboard. There are a total of 18 tracks in the game, with 4 of them being backward versions of existing tracks.

During races, the player can perform skateboard and snowboard-like tricks, like grinding on a rail, or spinning in midair, in order to get additional points. If playing a "bully" character, they can also collide with other racers to slow them down, or if not, must avoid being hit by AI racers. A VMU game called TrickStyle Jr. was included with the title, and plays in a similar manner to Snake.

Development 
TrickStyle's soundtrack was composed by hip-hop producer Kurtis Mantronik. The game was successfully ported to PS2 in 2000, a demo of which was shown at GDC, but it was ultimately never released on the system.

The game was re-released by its current owners, Throwback Entertainment, on GOG.com on December 29, 2015, and on Steam on February 21, 2017. iOS 10 Stickers for iMessage were released on October 11, 2016.

Reception

TrickStyle received mixed reviews on both platforms according to the review aggregation website GameRankings.

Jeffery Adam Young of NextGen called the Dreamcast version "an impressive game to watch, and an infuriating game to play. Track design is sadistic, and AI players are inhumanly adept. Good mostly for increasing your stress level." Brandon Justice of IGN said that the same console version "sports the best art direction I've ever seen in a console racer", and compared the game to Wipeout, although saying it lacked the sense of speed to surpass that series. While calling the game's lack of extras a "letdown", he states that he had a "great time" with the game and that it would "go a long way towards opening your eyes to the possibilities of racing on the Dreamcast." Tal Blevins of the same site praised the PC version's "stunning visuals and incredibly fluid gameplay", but called the soundtrack repetitive and stated that he quickly turned off the music. He also stated that the game was "screaming for" an option to play online against other players rather than just local multiplayer.

Ben Stahl of GameSpot said the Dreamcast version was "too easy to beat", and called the sound effects annoying while praising the music. He praised the "accurate" hoverboard physics, but called the character animations "inhuman". Calling it "perfect-for-a-rental", he nevertheless stated that the graphics were the only thing "great" about the title. Edge gave the same console version eight out of ten, saying: "Regardless of such quibbles [...] it remains a key PAL release, offering a refreshing slant on the racing genre." Geoff Richards of Eurogamer criticized the PC version as a "direct port" with a "too-easy" difficulty, but calling its visuals "stunning".

In one review, Four-Eyed Dragon of GamePro called the Dreamcast version "an instant classic. Skateboarders will enjoy doing mad stunts, and the slick courses and quick boards will mesmerize race fans. Urban surfing has never been better!" In another review, Scary Larry called the same console version "a good-looking fun game with a lot of attitude and some intense game play. It's a great addition to the Dreamcast library." Nash Werner, however, said that the PC version "feels like a badly converted console racing game rushed to the PC. Its appeal will last you a week at best. I'd ask Santa for something else this year!"

J.C. Herz of The New York Times called TrickStyle the only racing game on Dreamcast that "inspires hardware lust", calling its hoverboard physics "dreamy" and its visuals "razor sharp and achingly hip". In a 2009 retrospective, Eurogamer called the game a cult classic, saying that the game was "overlooked" in favor of Tony Hawk's Pro Skater.

Notes

References

External links
Official website, archived from the original
 

1999 video games
Acclaim Entertainment games
Cancelled PlayStation 2 games
Criterion Games games
Dreamcast games
Fantasy sports video games
Windows games
Video games developed in the United Kingdom
Multiplayer and single-player video games
Science fiction racing games
Extreme sports video games
Throwback Entertainment games